Monotaxis is a plant genus in the family Euphorbiaceae first described as a genus in 1829. The entire genus is endemic to Australia.

Species
 Monotaxis bracteata Nees ex Klotzsch - Western Australia
 Monotaxis grandiflora Endl. - Western Australia
 Monotaxis linifolia Brongn. - New South Wales
 Monotaxis luteiflora F.Muell. - Western Australia, South Australia, Northern Territory
 Monotaxis macrophylla Benth. - Queensland, New South Wales
 Monotaxis occidentalis Endl. - Western Australia
 Monotaxis paxii Grüning - Western Australia
 Monotaxis tenuis Airy Shaw - N Western Australia, N Northern Territory

References

Euphorbiaceae genera
Acalyphoideae
Endemic flora of Australia
Taxa named by Adolphe-Théodore Brongniart